Accreditation is the independent, third-party evaluation of a conformity assessment body (such as certification body, inspection body or laboratory) against recognised standards, conveying formal demonstration of its impartiality and competence to carry out specific conformity assessment tasks (such as certification, inspection and testing).

Accreditation bodies are established in many economies with the primary purpose of ensuring that conformity assessment bodies are subject to oversight by an authoritative body. Accreditation bodies, that have been peer evaluated as competent, sign regional and international arrangements to demonstrate their competence. These accreditation bodies then assess and accredit conformity assessment bodies to the relevant standards.

An authoritative body that performs accreditation is called an 'accreditation body'. The International Accreditation Forum (IAF) and International Laboratory Accreditation Cooperation (ILAC) provide international recognitions to accreditation bodies. There are many internationally recognized accreditation bodies approved by the IAF and ILAC.

The Emirates International Accreditation Centre (EIAC) is the largest accreditation body in Middle East region, whereas in South Asia the Pakistan National Accreditation Council (PNAC) and National Accreditation Board for Testing and Calibration Laboratories (NABL), Quality Council of India (QCI) are the largest. In East Asia, the China National Accreditation Board is the largest, while the United Kingdom Accreditation Service (UKAS) is the largest in Europe. The National Association of Testing Authorities (NATA) and the Joint Accreditation System of Australia and New Zealand (JAS-ANZ) being the largest in the Oceania region, with the South African National Accreditation System being the largest in Africa.

For most of the accreditation schemes, international standards issued by the International Organization for Standardization (ISO) are used.

Fields involved 

Accreditation processes are used in a wide variety of fields:
 Accredited investor
 Accredited in Public Relations
 Accredited registrar
 Construction
 Diplomatic accreditation
 Educational accreditation
 Higher education accreditation
ACGME (USA)
 List of recognized higher education accreditation organizations
 List of unrecognized higher education accreditation organizations
 Accreditation mill
 List of unaccredited institutions of higher learning
 Pre-tertiary education accreditation
 Email sender accreditation
 Food safety
Global Food Safety Initiative
Health & Safety Compliance (UK)
 Healthcare
American Association for Accreditation of Ambulatory Surgery Facilities
Accreditation Commission for Health Care
Electronic Healthcare Network Accreditation Commission
 Emirates International Accreditation Centre (EIAC) 
International healthcare accreditation
Commission on Accreditation of Rehabilitation Facilities
Hospital accreditation
Joint Commission (USA)
United Kingdom Accreditation Forum
 Information assurance
 Personal trainer accreditation
 Professional certification
 Systems engineering
 Translating and interpreting
 National Accreditation Authority for Translators and Interpreters (Australia)
 Sustainability
 Sustainable Forest management such as the Forest Stewardship Council (FSC)
 Sustainable fishing such as the Marine Stewardship Council (MSC)
 Sustainable aquaculture such as the Aquaculture Stewardship Council (ASC)
 Sustainable tourism such as the Global Sustainable Tourism Council (GSTC)

Accreditation standards 
Many accreditation bodies, such as the UKAS, EIAC, EGAC, PNAC, IAS, NABCB operate according to processes developed by the ISO as specified in ISO/IEC 17011. Accredited entities in specific sectors must provide evidence to the accreditation body that they conform to other standards in the same series:
 ISO/IEC 17020: "General criteria for the operation of various types of bodies performing inspection" (2012)
 ISO/IEC 17021-1: "Conformity assessment. Requirements for bodies providing audit and certification of management systems" (2015)
 ISO/IEC 17024: "Conformity Assessment. General requirements for bodies operating certification of persons" (2012)
 ISO/IEC 17025: "General requirements for the competence of testing and calibration laboratories" (2017)

See also 
 Accreditation Auditing Practices Group
Authentication
Certification
Certification and accreditation
Homologation
Quality assurance
Standards organization
Verification and validation

International agencies
International Accreditation Forum (IAF)
International Certification Accreditation Council (ICAC)
International Council on Educational Credential Evaluation (ICECE)
International Laboratory Accreditation Cooperation (ILAC)
National agencies
Department of Defence Information Assurance Certification and Accreditation Process
Deutsches Institut für Bautechnik

References

External links 
Asia 
 https://eiac.gov.ae/
 https://www.cnas.org.cn/ 
 http://www.pnac.gov.pk/
 National Accreditation Board for Certification Bodies (NABCB)

International Organization for Standardization

Americas 
ANSI Accreditation Programs
International Accreditation Service
Standards Council of Canada (SCC)
Accreditation Canada

Europe
 European co-operation for Accreditation

 
Quality assurance